Suzanne J. Crough (March 6, 1963 – April 27, 2015) was an American child actress best known for her role as Tracy Partridge on The Partridge Family.

Career

On The Partridge Family, a musical sitcom TV show which ran from 1970 to 1974, Crough played Tracy Partridge, the youngest Partridge sibling, who played the tambourine. After The Partridge Family, she made several TV movies and made guest appearances on television shows, including Mulligan's Stew. Her last credited on-screen role was as Kate in the 1980 TV movie Children of Divorce.

Post-acting life
Crough graduated from Los Angeles Pierce College and until 1993 owned and operated a bookstore. She married William Condray in July 1985; the couple had two daughters.

On March 2, 2010, during a reunion interview with several co-stars from The Partridge Family on The Today Show, she stated she was a manager at an OfficeMax in Bullhead City, Arizona.

Death
Crough died while sitting at her dining room table at her home in Laughlin, Nevada, on April 27, 2015, at the age of 52. The cause of death was not immediately reported, but Las Vegas police issued a statement that it was due to a "medical episode" and was "not suspicious". According to the coroner of Clark County, Nevada, Crough's cause of death was arrhythmogenic right ventricular dysplasia, a rare form of cardiomyopathy.

Several of Crough's Partridge Family co-stars paid tribute to her, including Shirley Jones and Danny Bonaduce. Bonaduce lamented, "Everyone thought I'd be the first Partridge to go. Sadly it was little Tracy. Suzanne was a wonderful lady and a good mom. She will be missed."

Filmography

References

External links

 
 
 

1963 births
2015 deaths
20th-century American actresses
American child actresses
American television actresses
American voice actresses
Actresses from Fullerton, California
Deaths from cardiomyopathy
Los Angeles Pierce College alumni
21st-century American women